Arthur Denning (23 April 1901 – 27 March 1975) was an Australian academic. He served as the first director of the University of New South Wales from 1949 to 1952. In 1955, the title of director was changed to Vice-Chancellor.

External links
Denning, Arthur (1901-1975), Australian Dictionary of Biography

References

1901 births
1975 deaths
Vice-Chancellors of the University of New South Wales